Lepidocephalichthys is a genus of ray-finned fish in the family Cobitidae.

Species
There are currently 18 recognized species in this genus:
 Lepidocephalichthys alkaia Havird & Page, 2010
 Lepidocephalichthys annandalei B. L. Chaudhuri, 1912 (Annandale loach)
 Lepidocephalichthys arunachalensis (A. K. Datta & Barman, 1984)
 Lepidocephalichthys barbatuloides (Bleeker, 1851)
 Lepidocephalichthys berdmorei (Blyth, 1860) (Burmese loach)
 Lepidocephalichthys coromandelensis (Menon, 1992)
 Lepidocephalichthys furcatus (de Beaufort, 1933)
 Lepidocephalichthys goalparensis Pillai & Yazdani, 1976
 Lepidocephalichthys guntea (F. Hamilton, 1822) (Guntea loach)
 Lepidocephalichthys hasselti (Valenciennes, 1846)
 Lepidocephalichthys irrorata Hora, 1921 (Loktak loach)
 Lepidocephalichthys jonklaasi (Deraniyagala, 1956) (Jonklaas' s loach)
 Lepidocephalichthys kranos Havird & Page, 2010
 Lepidocephalichthys lorentzi (M. C. W. Weber & de Beaufort, 1916)
 Lepidocephalichthys micropogon (Blyth, 1860)
 Lepidocephalichthys thermalis (Valenciennes, 1846) (Common spiny loach)
 Lepidocephalichthys tomaculum Kottelat & K. K. P. Lim, 1992
 Lepidocephalichthys zeppelini Havird & Tangjitjaroen, 2010

References 

Cobitidae
Taxa named by Pieter Bleeker
Taxonomy articles created by Polbot